Antônio Pompêo (23 February 1953 – 5 January 2016) was a Brazilian actor. He appeared in the television shows Balacobaco, Rebelde, A Casa das Sete Mulheres, O Rei do Gado, Mulheres de Areia and Pedra sobre Pedra. He also appeared in the films Xica (1976), Quilombo (1985), A Samba for Sherlock (2001) and Que sera, sera (2002). He was born in São José do Rio Preto or São José do Rio Pardo, São Paulo.

Pompêo was found dead in his apartment on 5 January 2016 in Rio de Janeiro, aged 62.

References

External links

 

1953 births
2016 deaths
Male actors from São Paulo (state)
Brazilian male film actors
Brazilian male television actors